Tân Hạnh is a ward located in Biên Hòa city of Đồng Nai province, Vietnam. It has an area of about 6.06km2 and the population in 2018 was 9,407.

References

Bien Hoa